Ad. Cova Lima or Associação Desportiva Cova Lima is a football club of East Timor from Cova Lima. The team plays in the Taça Digicel.

References

Football clubs in East Timor
Football
Cova Lima Municipality
Association football clubs established in 2010
2010 establishments in East Timor